The 25th South African Parliament was the fourth Parliament of South Africa to convene since the introduction of non-racial government in South Africa in 1994. It was elected in the general election of 22 April 2009, and first met on 6 May of that year to elect Jacob Zuma as the fourth President of South Africa. It was formally opened by the newly elected President's State of the Nation address in a joint sitting on 3 June 2009. The ANC retained its majority, although it was reduced to 264 seats out of 400 (66%) in the National Assembly, while the Democratic Alliance increased its lead of the opposition, taking 67 seats (16.75%). The Speaker of the National Assembly was Max Sisulu of the ANC and the Chairperson of the National Council of Provinces was M. J. Mahlangu, also of the ANC.

Parties represented

National Assembly

National Council of Provinces

See also
List of National Assembly members of the 25th Parliament of South Africa
List of National Council of Provinces members of the 25th Parliament of South Africa

References